Nannochloris is a genus of green algae in the family Chlorellaceae.

References

Trebouxiophyceae genera
Chlorellaceae